Duzal (also Romanized as Dūzāl; also known as Dozal) is a village in Nowjeh Mehr Rural District of Siah Rud District, Jolfa County, East Azerbaijan province, Iran. At the 2006 National Census, its population was 496 in 111 households. The following census in 2011 counted 545 people in 152 households. The latest census in 2016 showed a population of 532 people in 165 households; it was the largest village in its rural district.

References 

Jolfa County

Populated places in East Azerbaijan Province

Populated places in Jolfa County